This is a list containing the Billboard Hot Latin Tracks number-ones of 1996.

See also
Billboard Hot Latin Tracks

References

1996 record charts
Lists of Billboard Hot Latin Songs number-one songs
1996 in Latin music